Anna Davis (born March 17, 2006) is an American amateur golfer. In April 2022, Davis won the third Augusta National Women's Amateur at the age of 16. Davis shot a final round 69 (−3) to finish one under par, defeating Ingrid Lindblad and Latanna Stone, who tied for second.

Davis is the second teenage winner of the ANWA, following Tsubasa Kajitani in 2021. Davis, who is left handed, won the Girls Junior PGA Championship in July 2021, and was a member of the 2021 U.S. Junior Solheim Cup team.

References

American female golfers
Amateur golfers
Golfers from California
Sportspeople from San Diego County, California
2006 births
Living people